Läufelfingen railway station is a railway station in the municipality of Läufelfingen, in the Swiss canton of Basel-Landschaft. It is an intermediate stop on the summit branch of the Hauenstein line and is served by local trains only.

Services 
The following services stop at Läufelfingen:

 Basel S-Bahn : hourly service between Sissach and Olten.

References

External links 
 
 

Railway stations in Basel-Landschaft
Swiss Federal Railways stations